Marisa Linton is an author, historian, and member of the academic staff at Kingston University in London, where she is Professor Emerita in History. Having received her BA from Middlesex University in 1988 and PhD from University of Sussex in 1993, she specializes in the history of the French Revolution.

Her books include The Politics of Virtue in Enlightenment France (2001), Conspiracy in the French Revolution (2008), and Choosing Terror: Virtue, Friendship and Authenticity in the French Revolution (2013).

References

External links 
 Faculty page at Kingston University
 Interview with Marisa Linton (2016) at the French History Network

Year of birth missing (living people)
Living people
Academics of Kingston University
British historians
Historians of the French Revolution